Norman Dello Joio (born 7 June 1956) is an American equestrian and Olympic medalist. He was born in New York City. He qualified for the 1980 U.S. Olympic team but did not compete due to the U.S. Olympic Committee's boycott of the 1980 Summer Olympics in Moscow, Russia. Dello Joio was one of 461 athletes to receive a Congressional Gold Medal instead. He won a bronze medal in show jumping at the 1992 Summer Olympics in Barcelona.

He is the son of late composer Norman Dello Joio.

References

1956 births
Living people
American male equestrians
Congressional Gold Medal recipients
Olympic bronze medalists for the United States in equestrian
Equestrians at the 1992 Summer Olympics
Sportspeople from New York City
Medalists at the 1992 Summer Olympics
Pan American Games medalists in equestrian
Pan American Games gold medalists for the United States
Equestrians at the 1979 Pan American Games
Medalists at the 1979 Pan American Games